Wopke Bastiaan Hoekstra (born 30 September 1975) is a Dutch politician who has served as second Deputy Prime Minister of the Netherlands and Minister of Foreign Affairs in the fourth Rutte cabinet since 10 January 2022. He has also been Leader of the Christian Democratic Appeal (CDA) since 2020. Hoekstra previously served as Minister of Finance in the third Rutte cabinet from 2017 to 2022.

Early life
Hoekstra was born in Bennekom, Gelderland, and studied law at Leiden University from 1994 and obtained his LLM degree in 2001. He also studied history at this university for one year, in which he received a propaedeutic diploma in 1997. During his student days in Leiden he was president of the fraternity Minerva. He furthermore studied law and international politics in Rome in 2000, and obtained an MBA degree at INSEAD in Fontainebleau and Singapore in 2005.

Before he joined the government, Hoekstra was a partner with the consultancy firm McKinsey and chairman of the supervisory board of the National Maritime Museum in Amsterdam. Until 2006 he worked for Shell in Berlin, Hamburg and Rotterdam.

Political career

Early beginnings
Hoekstra was the treasurer of the CDA-affiliated foundation Eduardo Freistichting and board member of the local CDA association in Amsterdam. Ahead of the 2010 elections, Hoekstra was offered a spot on the party's candidate list for the House of Representatives, but he did not accept it, preferring to continue working at McKinsey.

In December 2010, it was announced that Hoekstra was a candidate for the Senate election of 2011, for which he was indeed elected, and sworn in on 7 June 2011 as its youngest member. Membership of the Senate is a part-time position, and therefore Hoekstra continued as consultant with McKinsey. On 6 December of the same year, he gave his maiden speech during the debate on a tax-related topic. In the Senate, he stood out as the party's spokesperson for pensions. He was not reluctant to deviate from the party line on a number of ethical issues: he was the only CDA senator to vote in favour of a ban on civil servants refusing to marry same-sex couples (weigerambtenaar) and to vote in favour of legal status for lesbian parents (meemoederschap). He was reelected in 2015. Ahead of the 2017 general election, Hoekstra helped writing the CDA's manifesto.

Hoekstra was nominated by the parliamentary press in 2013 as 'political talent of the year' and in 2016 he was the second-youngest person in the De Volkskrant top-200 of influential Dutch people. In 2016, he was one of the lead architects of the party platform.

Minister of Finance, 2017–2022
Hoekstra was appointed Minister of Finance in the third Rutte cabinet on 26 October 2017, succeeding Jeroen Dijsselbloem.

At his first meeting with other EU Ministers of Finance in Brussels in 2017, Hoekstra expressed scepticism about eurozone reform, saying that budgetary discipline in other eurozone states was necessary first. Hoekstra reiterated his reluctance on eurozone reform at a meeting of the financial council of the Christian Democratic Union of Germany in 2018, warning against reforms initiated by Germany and France without the support of other member states or the public. Furthermore, at a visit to his German counterpart Olaf Scholz in March 2018, Hoekstra explained that he is reluctant about plans for an eurozone budget, an eurozone finance minister and a common deposit insurance scheme. After Germany and France had outlined a series of eurozone reforms in June 2018, Hoekstra led a coalition of twelve other member states in opposition to such reforms, which would later be referred to as the New Hanseatic League. In January 2019, Hoekstra criticised the European Commission for its decision not to launch a disciplinary procedure against Italy over its deficit and debt, stating "It’s a missed opportunity to do the right thing for the long run", a concern later repeated by Prime Minister Mark Rutte at the World Economic Forum.

During his time in office, Hoekstra oversaw the government's purchase of a stake in Air France KLM equal to that of the French government to increase its influence in the carrier's business operations in 2019. That same year, led negotiations with the German government on the possibility of buying a stake in grid operator TenneT.

Since 2018, Hoekstra has been chairing a newly established, informal grouping of small northern and Baltic EU member states – Estonia, Finland, Ireland, Latvia, Lithuania and the Netherlands –  to find common cause on the direction of eurozone reforms. Hoekstra has also expressed his opposition to an increase in the Netherlands' contribution to the EU budget as a result of Brexit. In 2019, Hoekstra joined forces with his counterparts of Germany, France, Italy, Spain and Latvia in pushing for the establishment of new EU supervisory authority that would take over from states the oversight of money laundering at financial firms.

In March 2020, after a tense meeting with fellow EU national leaders where Hoekstra called for an investigation into southern European countries’ proclaimed lack of budgetary capacity to cope with the COVID-19 pandemic, Portuguese Prime Minister António Costa referred to his comments as "repugnant", saying that "this recurrent pettiness completely undermines what the spirit of the European Union is."

On 31 October 2020, Hoekstra stated that the Dutch government would not provide further financial assistance to KLM as long as it did not agree with financial sacrifices by all employees for a period of five years. In discussions with KLM, the Dutch Airline Pilots Association (Dutch: Vereniging van Nederlandse Verkeersvliegers) and the Federation of Dutch Trade Unions refused to comply with the five-year period Hoekstra requested. Several days later the parties agreed with the terms and the Dutch cabinet approved the deal with KLM on 4 November.

On 11 December 2020, a day after Hugo de Jonge announced his resignation as Leader of the Christian Democratic Appeal, the party's board unanimously nominated Hoekstra to succeed him.

On 15 January 2021, Hoekstra stepped down along with the Dutch government, after thousands of families were wrongly accused of child welfare fraud. In April 2021, he joined forces with Sigrid Kaag in putting forward a motion of censure to voice their disapproval of Prime Minister Rutte.

On 2009, leaked documents show that Hoekstra obtained shares in an offshore company, Candace Management Ltd., based in the British Virgin Islands. He acquired more shares in 2013 and 2014, while he was a senator.

On 5 October 2021, Paul Tang, a Dutch centre-left MEP who chairs the European Parliament's tax committee, argued that Hoekstra should symbolically stay out of the EU tax-haven decision. "Hoekstra, who had investments in the British Virgin Islands (BVI), should excuse himself from this decision," Tang added.

Minister of Foreign Affairs, 2022–present

On 10 January 2022, Hoekstra was appointed Minister of Foreign Affairs and Deputy Prime Minister in the fourth Rutte cabinet.

Other activities

European Union organisations
 European Investment Bank (EIB), Ex-Officio Member of the Board of Governors (2017–2021)
 European Stability Mechanism (ESM), Member of the Board of Governors (2017–2021)

International organisations
 Asian Infrastructure Investment Bank (AIIB), Ex-Officio Member of the Board of Governors (2017–2021)
 European Bank for Reconstruction and Development (EBRD), Ex-Officio Member of the Board of Governors (2017–2021)
 Joint World Bank-IMF Development Committee, Member
 Multilateral Investment Guarantee Agency (MIGA), World Bank Group, Ex-Officio Member of the Board of Governors (2017–2021)
 World Bank, Ex-Officio Member of the Board of Governors (2017–2021)

Non-profit organisations
 Nederlands Scheepvaartmuseum, Member of the Supervisory Board
 Friends of the Hubrecht Institute for Developmental Biology and Stem Cell Research, Member of the Board
 Princess Máxima Center for Pediatric Oncology, Ambassador

Honours
: Commander Grand Cross of the Royal Order of the Polar Star (2022)
: Order of Prince Yaroslav the Wise of the III degree (2022)

Personal life
Hoekstra lives with his wife, a general practitioner, and four children. He is a member of the Remonstrant Brotherhood.

References

External links

  Mr. W.B. (Wopke) Hoekstra Parlement & Politiek
  Mr. W.B. Hoekstra (CDA) Eerste Kamer der Staten-Generaal

1975 births
Living people
Christian Democratic Appeal politicians
Dutch columnists
Dutch expatriates in France
Dutch expatriates in Germany
Dutch expatriates in Italy
Dutch expatriates in Singapore
Dutch management consultants
Dutch nonprofit directors
INSEAD alumni
Leaders of the Christian Democratic Appeal
Leiden University alumni
McKinsey & Company people
Members of the House of Representatives (Netherlands)
Members of the Senate (Netherlands)
Ministers of Finance of the Netherlands
Ministers of Foreign Affairs of the Netherlands
People from Bussum
People from Ede, Netherlands
People named in the Pandora Papers
Remonstrants
Recipients of the Order of Prince Yaroslav the Wise, 3rd class